KOWY (102.3 FM) is a radio station broadcasting an Adult Contemporary format. Licensed to Dayton, Wyoming, the station serves the Sheridan, Wyoming area, and is owned by Lovcom, Inc.

References

External links
KOWY's webpage

Mainstream adult contemporary radio stations in the United States
OWY